These are the Canadian number-one country albums of 2000, per the RPM Country Albums chart.

References

2000
2000 record charts
2000 in Canadian music